Elizabeth Midlarsky (1941-2023) was an American professor of psychology and education at Teachers College, Columbia University.

Education 
Elizabeth Midlarsky completed a Bachelor of Arts at Brooklyn College. She earned a Master of Arts and doctor of philosophy from Northwestern University.

Career 

Midlarsky was a psychologist and a professor of clinical psychology at Teachers College, Columbia University. Midlarsky was a pioneer in the field of altruism, inspired by helpers during the Holocaust. Applying clinical psychology, Midlarsky researched what caused people to help others with no benefit to themselves, as well as the impacts of being rescued from the genocide in survivors and their descendants.

Personal life 
Midlarsky was Jewish.
She was married to Manus Midlarsky, and they had three children together. Her middle daughter is a Rabbi and married to a Rabbi. She passed away on January 4, 2023.

Selected works

Books

References

External links

American women psychologists
20th-century American women writers
21st-century American women writers
20th-century American non-fiction writers
21st-century American non-fiction writers
Jewish American social scientists
Teachers College, Columbia University faculty
Brooklyn College alumni
Northwestern University alumni
20th-century American scientists
21st-century American scientists
20th-century American women scientists
21st-century American women scientists
American women academics
21st-century American Jews